HD 183263 c is an exoplanet orbiting approximately 4.25 AU from the parent star HD 183263. This planet was announced by Wright et al. on December 8, 2008 using multiple observations in Lick and Keck Observatories earlier in that year. This planet was calculated to have minimum mass of 3.82 times more than Jupiter and takes 8.08 years to revolve around the star. The orbital distance varies from 3.17 to 5.33 AU, corresponding to the orbital eccentricity of 0.253.

A 2022 study estimated the true mass of HD 183263 c at about  via astrometry, although this estimate is poorly constrained.

See also
 HD 183263 b

References

External links
 

Aquila (constellation)
Exoplanets discovered in 2008
Giant planets
Exoplanets detected by radial velocity
Exoplanets detected by astrometry